Eucalyptus honey is a type of honey made by honeybees that forage on eucalyptus.  It is common in Australia, in Western Cape in South Africa, and in Brazil. 	

Monofloral eucalypt honeys include Jarrah, Yellow Box, Grey box, Blue Gum, River Red Gum, Ironbark, Stringybark and Messmate.

Eucalyptus honey varies greatly in color and flavor, but in general, it tends to be a bold-flavored honey with a slightly medicinal aftertaste. It may be used in baked goods, sauces, dressings. (Tasmanian Leatherwood honey is considered a delicacy, but is not a eucalypt honey) 	

The color is light amber to medium-dark red.

Honey